A telecommunications pedestal is a ground-level housing for a passive connection point for underground cables. Technicians require access to connection points. Placing such a point underground (e.g., in a utility vault) is expensive, so pedestals are preferred when they are an acceptable choice. Pedestals are used for CATV (known as a cable box in such a situation), telephone, passive optical networks, and other telecommunications systems.

A pedestal is generally a sheet metal or plastic housing that encloses a passive termination block. The pedestal is usually about 3 feet high and has a diameter of less than one foot, with a circular, rectangular, oval, or "rounded rectangle" cross-section. The pedestal either has an access panel or removable housing. One, two, three or (occasionally) more underground distribution cables rise from the ground into the bottom of the pedestal and the individual circuits from the cables are terminated on the termination block. In addition to distribution cables, the pedestal may terminate one or more individual underground subscriber cables. The cables are cross-connected as needed at the termination block.

External links

Telecommunications equipment